Jin Kim (Korean name: Kim Sang-jin) is a South Korean animator and character designer best known for his work at Walt Disney Animation Studios from 1995 to 2016.  He was the first Korean animator to work for Disney.  

Kim has red-green color blindness.  Due to Korean college admissions policies at the time, he was unable to get into art school and ended up majoring in economics in college.  Regardless, he persisted in developing his drawing skills and was eventually able to embark on a career as an animator. 

In 2016, Hong Sung-ho, president of Locus Studios, persuaded Kim to return to South Korea to work as executive creative director of the Korean feature animated film Red Shoes (which premiered in July 2019).  According to Hong, at that time, Kim had been left with nothing new to design because Disney was then focused on developing sequels rather than entirely new films. Kim was also happy to work with an animation team in the Korean language for the first time since a three-year period in the South Korean animation industry at the beginning of his career.

In May 2018, Kim returned to Los Angeles to work on Pearl Studio/Netflix's film, Over the Moon (2020), which was directed by fellow Disney animator Glen Keane.  As of August 2019, Kim had joined a new project at Disney. He worked on both Raya and the Last Dragon and Encanto.

Filmography

Awards and nominations

References

External links
 

Place of birth missing (living people)
Year of birth missing (living people)
Living people
South Korean animators
Walt Disney Animation Studios people
Hanna-Barbera people
South Korean storyboard artists